Northern Illinois Food Bank is a 501(c)(3) non-profit organization that focuses on providing food to those in need in northern Illinois. Partnerships and donors allow for more than 71,000 people to be fed each week through different programs. Northern Illinois Food Bank operates in 13 counties surrounding Chicago. The organization has four distribution centers located in Geneva, Rockford, Park City, and Joliet, which distribute food to pantries who then allocate the food to people.

History 
In 1982, Sister Rosemarie Burian decided to create a food bank out of DuPage County, Illinois. In 1983 she opened the Bethlehem Center, now known as the Northern Illinois Food Bank. Nearly 64,000 pounds of food were allocated among 80 different food pantries during Bethlehem Center's first year of operation. By 1985 the center serviced over 100 food pantries in DuPage, Will, Kane, and McHenry counties in Northern Illinois. In 1992, Northern Illinois Food Bank became a certified affiliate of Feeding America, the nation's food bank network. In October 2001, they opened their second distribution center in Park City. The third distribution center was opened in Rockford in 2005. By 2008, they were distributing 22 million pounds of food. In 2011, they had more than 600 partners organizations placing orders and 36 million pounds of food were distributed. Their fourth distribution center opened in 2018, in Joliet.

Julie Yurko was name President and CEO of the food bank in 2014.

Partnerships 
Donations come from food corporations and from grocery stores who give slightly damaged and unsellable goods. In 2007, they started working with Sam's Club and in that year alone they donated 1 million pounds of food. In 2009, Walmart donated 40 refrigerated trucks and Northern Illinois Food Bank managed to get one of them. In 2010, Highland Park Hospital donated $10,000. Jewel-Osco has donated food to the Northern Illinois Food Bank since the late 1980s. In 2017, Jewel-Osco's Bensenville location donated 38,000 cans of garbanzo beans to the food bank which helped provide an estimated 35,000 meals to those in need. In the same year they donated 14 million pounds of food, and in 2018, Jewel-Osco partnered with Hormel Foods and donated 33,122 jars of peanut butter, enough to make 500,000 sandwiches. In 2016, Tyson Foods donated 108,049 pounds of protein to the food bank. Donations not only come from food corporations, other organizations donate money as well, such as the MetLife Foundation that gave the food bank a $25,000 grant in 2011, enough to provide 150,000 meals. In 2017, the food bank partnered with employees at Partners Warehouse and Elwood Fire Department to provide 260 boxes of food to 2,000 people right before the American holiday season.

Distribution Centers 
Northern Illinois Food Bank has four distribution centers. They are located in Geneva, Loves Park, Park City, and Joliet.

The West Suburban Center (Geneva) is the largest with 147,000 square feet and provides 5.5 million meals a day in 13 counties outside Cook County.

The North Suburban Center (Park City) distribution center has 9,600 square feet of space.

The Northwest Center (Rockford) distribution center has 23,000 square feet of space.

The South Suburban Office (Joliet) distribution center serves Will, Kankakee, Kendall, and Grundy counties. The new warehouse is estimated to increase the capacity of the food bank by one million meals a year. The Joliet location has 18,000 square feet of space rented from Harvest Bible Chapel and includes refrigerators and freezers to store cold foods.

Programs

Meals On the Move 
During the summer, Northern Illinois Food Bank operates a mobile program called Meals on the Move. The Meals on the Move truck travels to six different locations throughout Aurora to serve free meals to children 18 years and young. The program is administered by the Illinois State Board of Education in partnership with the USDA Summer Food Service Program. The program partners with the Aurora Public Library bookmobile and Fox Valley Park District Neighborhood Art Program to provide activities for the children.

Spartan Food Pantry 
Kristi Crawford and Atlee Mathews worked with the food bank to start a pilot program at West Elementary School in Sycamore. The pantry opened on October 3, 2018 and is supplied by Northern Illinois Food Bank every two weeks.

Holiday Meal Box 
The Holiday Meal Box program is a yearly event conducted by the food bank. The program packs boxes with a traditional holiday meal and distributes the boxes to families in need throughout November and December. Companies participating in the annual program have included Tyson Foods, Kellogg's, and Jewel-Osco.

Summer Meal Program 
The Summer Meal Program provides breakfast, lunch and snacks at over 130 locations to children 18 and under and runs from June to mid-August. In 2017 the Summer Meal Program served 245,000 meals at parks, churches, schools, and other sites.

Events and Fundraising 
Northern Illinois Food Bank holds a yearly Stars and Cars fundraiser. The fundraising event started in 2012. Stars and Cars takes place at Steve Foley Motors in Northbrook. Travel packages, sports memorabilia, and local sports tickets have been auctioned off to raise funds. In 2017, the event raised $154,000.

Northern Illinois Food Bank 2019 fundraising events include A Cup of Hope and the 6th Annual Foodie 5k.

Northern Illinois Food Bank annually holds an event called A Taste That Matters sponsored by Jewel-Osco. The event includes silent auction and food made by more than 30 local chefs.

Charity ratings 
Charity Navigator rated Northern Illinois Food Bank three out of four stars and gave it an overall score of 85.85%. The star rating is a reflection of the overall score. The overall score indicates how efficiently a charity will use their support, how well it has sustained its programs and services over time, and their level of commitment to accountability and transparency."

The USDA gave Northern Illinois Food Bank's Summer Meal Program a silver "Turnip the Beet" award ranking.

See also

 List of food banks

References

External links
 

1983 establishments in Illinois
Food banks in Illinois
Organizations established in 1983